The 1989 World Sambo Championships were held in West Orange, USA in November 1989. Championships were organized by FIAS.

Medal overview

External links 
Results on Sambo.net.ua

World Sambo Championships
1989 in sambo (martial art)
West Orange, New Jersey